The Caldwell-Hopson House in Tiptonville, Tennessee is a two-story weatherboarded frame house built in about 1891 which is Queen Anne-influenced in style.  It was listed on the National Register of Historic Places in 1993.

According to its NRHP nomination, "Its steeply pitched roof, asymmetrical facade, two story bay, and distinctive porch make Caldwell-Hopson House a prime example of a Queen Anne-influenced residence in this small farming community. It is one of the few remaining houses of historic value in the county and is an excellent example of craftsmanship, construction, and design."

References

National Register of Historic Places in Lake County, Tennessee
Queen Anne architecture in Tennessee
Houses completed in 1891